Henrietta Foster Crosman (September 2, 1861 – October 31, 1944) was an American stage and film actress.

Early years 
Crosman was born in Wheeling, Virginia, to George Crosman Jr. a Civil War Major, and Mary B. Wick, a niece of composer Stephen Foster. Her grandfather was a Civil War General, George H. Crosman.

Crosman was born the year the Civil War started and moved all over the US from post to post with her army father, and so was educated in many places. On leaving school she decided to become an actress.

When she was 16, Crosman spent a year in Paris studying music with thoughts of singing grand opera. After her voice broke during a vocal lesson, she left France and thereafter turned her thoughts toward a career in theater.

Theatrical career
Crosman got her start in 1883 at the old Windsor Theatre, New York with the assistance of the long-time theatre manager John A. Ellsler. Her debut role was as Lilly in Bartley Campbell's The White Slave.<ref>[https://books.google.com/books?id=u7kaAAAAYAAJ&pg=PT283&dq= The Burr McIntosh Monthly 1905]; accessed May 25, 2013.</ref>

She later toured the country with Robert L. Downing in classic parts. In 1889 she appeared in her first Shakespeare play, As You Like It, at Augustin Daly's theater. During the course of the early 1890s she was managed by Daniel Frohman and appeared in his stock company. From 1892 to 1894 her career was managed by Daniel's brother, Charles Frohman. For a short period during 1891, and in between Frohman brothers, she was under the aegis of A. M. Palmer.

In 1899, Crosman was hired as the Leading Lady for the summer season at the Elitch Theatre in Denver, Colorado. Shows that summer included The Charity Ball, The Senator, and a production of Cyrano de Bergerac that called for 100 actors. Crosman would return to Elitch Theatre in 1903 for several pre-season performances.

By 1900 Crosman was a star and appeared for the first time as such in Mistress Nell keeping in line with the sort of costume adventures that were becoming her forte. In 1902, she appeared in the productions of "Joan of the Shoals", "As You Like It" and "The Sword of the King". In 1903, she premiered another exceptional play, "Sweet Kitty Bellairs". Several of these plays would be made as films in the silent era played by younger actresses.

In 1911, she and her company staged 60 performances of Catherine Chisholm Cushing's comedy The Real Thing at the Maxine Elliott Theatre in New York, before taking the show on the road. In early July 1912, Crosman and company were in Regina, Saskatchewan following the Regina Cyclone, and staged a benefit performance of The Real Thing for the victims.

 
Now in her forties, Crosman was starting to move away from the strenuous sword-carrying, heavy costume adventures that she was popular in. Much of the remainder of her theatrical career would consist of drawing room comedies and farces, a type of playing that was less hectic for an ageing actress. However, she would return to revivals of Shakespeare, i.e. The Merry Wives of Windsor, and in Richard Brinsley Sheridan's The Rivals.

Films

Crosman, like many a heralded stage star, held off from motion pictures. But by 1914 and possibly out of curiosity she 'signed up', as the popular motto went at the time, for a one-picture deal with Adolph Zukor's Famous Players. It was a film version of The Unwelcome Mrs. Hatch, which as a play had been a winning success for Mrs Fiske in 1901 on Broadway. The Supreme Test followed in 1915 for Universal Studios but afterwards her silent film appearances were sporadic. Her husband Maurice Campbell joined his wife in the movie industry eventually becoming a noted director.

By 1930 silent films had given way to talking pictures and as in 1914 the motion picture business courted stage trained actors. Crosman a veteran and now approaching seventy had a career resurgence endearing herself to a new younger generation who never had the chance to see her in her youth on stage. She gave a heartbreaking performance in a rare lead film role in Pilgrimage (1933) as the embittered mother of a soldier killed in World War I who travels to the Argonne and undergoes a spiritual renewal. An earlier talkie in which she appeared was The Royal Family of Broadway'' (1930), a Paramount version of the play by Edna Ferber, loosely based on the Barrymore family.

Personal life
In 1886, Crosman married Sedley Browne. A year later, they had a son, Sedley Browne Jr. The Brownes divorced in 1896, after which their son changed his name to George Crosman. Later in 1896, she married newspaperman Maurice Campbell, who later became a stage producer and a director of silent films. They had a son, Maurice Campbell Jr.

Maurice Campbell became a Broadway producer. He and Crosman joined the nascent silent film industry; he was a noted film director in the 1920s. The marriage to Campbell, eight years her junior, was a happy one and ended with his death in 1942. Henrietta Crosman survived her husband by two years, dying in 1944, aged 83. Biographical information for Crosman is archived in the University of Pittsburgh.

Filmography

References

External links

 
 
 
Henrietta Crosman gallery at the NY Public Library
Henrietta Crosman  1892 portrait Univ of Louisville Macauley Theater Collection
 Henrietta Crosman picture gallery Univ of Washington Sayre collection
article and portrait on Maurice Campbell

1861 births
1944 deaths
19th-century American actresses
American stage actresses
20th-century American actresses
Actresses from West Virginia
American silent film actresses
American film actresses
Actors from Wheeling, West Virginia
People from Pelham Manor, New York